"Spiegel" (English: "Mirror") is a 2005 song by German pop-rap girl group Tic Tac Toe. It was released as their comeback single in December 2005, after a five-year hiatus. The song met with commercial success and was a top 10 hit in Germany, Austria and Switzerland. It later appeared on their fourth and final album Comeback.

The song's lyrics tell about personal problems of three fictional individuals at a group psychotherapy, with each Tic Tac Toe member representing a different character. Jazzy takes the role of a teenage girl called Kerstin who has low self-esteem due to her overweight, Ricky is a young woman Michelle whose modelling career is taking its toll on her life, and Lee represents Bernard, a man caught up in a rat race, whose job has a negative impact on his family. In the song's climax, Bernard pulls out a gun and in a rage commits suicide.

Track listing
 CD Single
 "Spiegel" – 5:08
 "Spiegel" (Radio Edit) – 4:54
 "Spiegel" (Radio Short Edit) – 4:18
 "Spiegel" (Oacland Remix) – 4:47
 "Spiegel" (Aquarian Remix) – 4:48

Charts

Weekly charts

Year-end charts

References                 

2005 singles
2005 songs
Tic Tac Toe (band) songs
German-language songs
Songs about depression